The Pennsylvania Auditor General election of 2012 was held on November 6, 2012. The primary election was held on April 24, 2012.

Candidates
John Maher, State Representative for the 40th district defeated Frank Pinto, a former banking lobbyist, in the Republican primary. Eugene DePasquale, State Representative for the 95th district, ran unopposed in the Democratic primary. Betsy Elizabeth Summers was the Libertarian candidate.

Results
On November 6, 2012, Eugene DePasquale defeated John Maher to be elected Auditor General of Pennsylvania.

References

2012 Pennsylvania elections
Pennsylvania Auditor General elections
November 2012 events in the United States
Pennsylvania